In the mathematical field of category theory, the product of two categories C and D, denoted  and called a product category, is an extension of the concept of the Cartesian product of two sets. Product categories are used to define bifunctors and multifunctors.

Definition
The product category  has:
as objects:
pairs of objects , where A is an object of C and B of D;
as composition, component-wise composition from the contributing categories:
;
as identities, pairs of identities from the contributing categories:
1(A, B) = (1A, 1B).

Relation to other categorical concepts
For small categories, this is the same as the action on objects of the categorical product in the category Cat. A functor whose domain is a product category is known as a bifunctor. An important example is the Hom functor, which has the product of the opposite of some category with the original category as domain:

Hom : Cop × C → Set.

Generalization to several arguments
Just as the binary Cartesian product is readily generalized to an n-ary Cartesian product, binary product of two categories can be generalized, completely analogously, to a product of n categories. The product operation on categories is commutative and associative, up to isomorphism, and so this generalization brings nothing new from a theoretical point of view.

References

 Definition 1.6.5 in 
 
 

Category theory